The 2020 New York Open was a men's tennis tournament played on indoor hard courts. It was the third edition of the New York Open, and part of the ATP Tour 250 series of the 2020 ATP Tour. It took place in Uniondale, New York, United States, at the Nassau Veterans Memorial Coliseum from February 10 through 16, 2020.

Singles main-draw entrants

Seeds 

 1 Rankings are as of February 3, 2020.

Other entrants 
The following players received wildcards into the singles main draw:
  Brayden Schnur 
  Brian Shi 
  Jack Sock

The following players received entry from the qualifying draw:
  Jason Jung 
  Paolo Lorenzi 
  Danilo Petrović
  Go Soeda

Withdrawals
Before the tournament
  Nick Kyrgios → replaced by  Marcos Giron
  Kei Nishikori → replaced by  Damir Džumhur
  Sam Querrey → replaced by  Dominik Koepfer

Doubles main-draw entrants

Seeds 

 1 Rankings are as of February 3, 2020.

Other entrants 
The following pairs received wildcards into the doubles main draw:
  John Isner /  Tommy Paul
  Shawn Jackson /  Ostap Kovalenko

Champions

Singles 

  Kyle Edmund def.  Andreas Seppi, 7–5, 6–1

Doubles 

  Dominic Inglot /  Aisam-ul-Haq Qureshi def.  Steve Johnson /  Reilly Opelka, 7–6(7–5), 7–6(8–6)

References

External links 

New York Open (tennis)
New York Open
New York Open
New York Open
New York Open